Events from the year 1876 in China.

Incumbents
 Guangxu Emperor (2nd year)
 Regent: Empress Dowager Cixi

Events
 Dungan Revolt (1862–77)
 Northern Chinese Famine of 1876–79
 Woosung Road constructed in Shanghai, Jiangsu

References